Jules Leventhal (November 29, 1888 – April 13, 1949) was an American theatre producer. He was given the Special Tony Award at the 1st Tony Awards.

References

External links 

1888 births
1949 deaths
American theatre managers and producers
Special Tony Award recipients